The Atlantic Hockey Most Valuable Player in Tournament is an annual award given out at the conclusion of the Atlantic Hockey conference tournament to the most valuable player in the championship as voted by the coaches of each Atlantic Hockey team. The recipient of the tournament MVP has come from the championship team each time it has been awarded. (as of 2013)

Award winners

Winners by school

Winners by position

See also
Atlantic Hockey Awards
MAAC Tournament Most Valuable Player

References

External links
2004 Atlantic Hockey Championship
2005 Atlantic Hockey Championship
2006 Atlantic Hockey Championship
2007 Atlantic Hockey Championship
2008 Atlantic Hockey Championship
2009 Atlantic Hockey Championship
2010 Atlantic Hockey Championship
2011 Atlantic Hockey Championship
2012 Atlantic Hockey Championship
2013 Atlantic Hockey Championship

College ice hockey trophies and awards in the United States